Avalon Heroes, known as Avalon Online in Asia, was a free-to-play multiplayer online battle arena video game developed by WeMade Entertainment for Microsoft Windows. The game is heavily based on Warcraft III: The Frozen Thrones popular mod CHAOS which is also heavily based on Defense of the Ancients. Avalon Heroes did get some attention in eSports circles. The game was closed on 8 February 2013 due to not having enough active players.

References

External links
Official website of alaplaya

2010 video games
Free-to-play video games
Multiplayer online battle arena games
Multiplayer video games
Video games developed in South Korea
Windows games
Windows-only games